Herman Wilhelm "Bill" Glerum (born 28 August 1911 in Amsterdam – died 24 August 2002) was a Dutch cricketer.

Glerum played one first-class game for the Free Foresters in 1957 against Oxford University. He took 2/16 and 1/16 bowling, and scored one run in the match. He captained VRA and the All Holland XI, and during some years in South America he played for Brazil XI and South America XI.

References

1911 births
2002 deaths
Dutch cricketers
Sportspeople from Amsterdam
Free Foresters cricketers
20th-century Dutch people
21st-century Dutch people